Indira Bajt (née Babataeva, born 1980) is a Kazakhstani-Slovenian woman chess player. Bajt is a Woman FIDE Master (WFM) with a peak Elo rating of 2225. She was a member of Slovenia women's team at the 39th Chess Olympiad.

She represented her native Kazakhstan until 2006.

Notable results
1st place in the Slovenian Blitz Championship in 2010
2nd place in the Slovenian Women's Championship in 2010
2nd place in the Slovenian Women's Championship in 2009
2nd place in the Slovenian Women's Championship in 2007
3rd place in the Slovenian Women's Championship in 2006

References

External links 

 
 
 

1980 births
Living people
Kazakhstani female chess players
Slovenian female chess players
Chess Woman FIDE Masters
Naturalized citizens of Slovenia
Slovenian people of Kazakhstani descent
Chess Olympiad competitors